Sankarlal is a 1981 Indian Tamil-language action film, written, directed and produced by T. N. Balu. It stars Kamal Haasan in dual lead roles as father and son. Balu died half-way during production, and the film was eventually completed with N. K. Viswanathan as director. The film was simultaneously shot in Telugu-language as Andagaadu with Allu Rama Lingaiah and Rao Gopal Rao.

Plot 

The film begins with an ordinary man Dharmalingam vacationing in Ooty with his family where he is framed for murder by a criminal Chelladurai. Dharmalingam is jailed while his wife, son Mohan and daughter Seetha all end up split from each other. After several years, the vengeful Dharmalingam returns to confront Chelladurai as the secretive Sankarlal and also desperately is on the lookout for his lost family. Chelladurai has meanwhile kidnapped a girl named Hema for ransom and Mohan is deputed by Hema's father to rescue her. This results in Dharmalingam and Mohan locking horns in their fight against their common enemy Chelladurai.

Cast 
Kamal Haasan as Dharmalingam (Sankarlal) [Damodaram in Telugu] and Mohan
Sridevi as Hema
Seema as Seetha/Baabi, Dharmalingam's daughter.
P. R. Varalakshmi as Dhanalakshmi, Dharmalingam's wife & Mohan's Mother.
Suruli Rajan as Kanthasamy Pillai, Hema's father.
Allu Rama Lingaiah as Hema's father (Telugu version).
R. S. Manohar as Selladurai
 Rao Gopal Rao (Telugu version)
 S. A. Ashokan as Natarajan (Guest appearance)
 V. Gopalakrishnan as Maari, Natarajan servant.
 Vennira Aadai Moorthy as Hotel server (Guest appearance)
 Hema
 Baby Babeetha
 Baby Vanthana

Production 
Sripriya was considered for the leading female role, before Sridevi was finalised.

Soundtrack 
The music was composed by Ilaiyaraaja (only Elankiliyae) and Gangai Amaran.

Tamil version

References

External links 
 
 

1981 action films
1980s multilingual films
1980s Tamil-language films
1980s Telugu-language films
1981 films
Films scored by Gangai Amaran
Films scored by Ilaiyaraaja
Indian action films
Indian multilingual films